Steve Morgan or Stephen Morgan may refer to:

 Stephen Morgan (meteorologist), television host, anchor and weatherman working for Fox Weather
 Steve Morgan (businessman) (born 1952), English businessman and chairman of Wolverhampton Wanderers F.C.
 Steve Morgan (footballer, born 1968), English footballer
 Steve Morgan (footballer, born 1970), Welsh footballer
 Stephen Morgan (American politician) (1854–1928), U.S. Representative from Ohio
 Stephen Morgan (British politician) (born 1981), British Member of Parliament for Portsmouth South
 Stephen L. Morgan (born 1971), professor of sociology and education